Wang Shengjun (born October 15, 1946 in Suzhou, Anhui) is a retired Chinese politician who was the President of the Supreme People's Court of China from March 2008 to March 2013.

Biography
He joined the Chinese Communist Party (CCP) in 1972.

Wang was appointed as the Secretary General of the Central Political and Legislative Committee in 1998. He was the member of the 16th, 17th and 18th CCP Central Committees. Wang has no formal legal training. During his presidency, he emphasized the "Three Supremes" doctrine articulated by CCP general secretary Hu Jintao.

He was a vice chairman of the Standing Committee of the National People's Congress between 2013 and 2018.

References 

1946 births
Living people
20th-century Chinese judges
21st-century Chinese judges
Chairperson and vice chairpersons of the Standing Committee of the 12th National People's Congress
Chinese Communist Party politicians from Anhui
Chinese police officers
Members of the 16th Central Committee of the Chinese Communist Party
Members of the 17th Central Committee of the Chinese Communist Party
Members of the 18th Central Committee of the Chinese Communist Party
People's Republic of China politicians from Anhui
Politicians from Suzhou, Anhui
Presidents of the Supreme People's Court